Rick Maedje is an American logger, builder, real estate consultant and politician from Montana. Maedje is a former Republican member of Montana House of Representatives. He is a graduate of Harvard University Faculty of Arts & Sciences School with a B.A. in Government.

Career 
Maedje is a logger.

On November 5, 2002, Maedje won the election and became a Republican member of Montana House of Representatives for District 81. Maedje defeated Pete Zarnowski with 62.07% of the votes.

On November 2, 2004, Maedje won the election and became a Republican member of Montana House of Representatives for District 2. Maedje defeated Noel E. Williams with 58.24% of the votes.

Personal life 
Maedje lives in Fortine, Montana.

In May 2006, Maedje was arrested for partner assault of Kathy Wade, a former girl-friend. The case was dismissed when Wade admitted in writing Maedje did not commit any assault.

See also 
 Montana House of Representatives, District 2

References

External links 
 REP. RICK MAEDJE (R) - HD81

Living people
Loggers from Montana
Republican Party members of the Montana House of Representatives
People from Lincoln County, Montana
Year of birth missing (living people)
Harvard College alumni